The Justice Party held a leadership election between 6 and 11 July 2017. It was an election to elect a new leader as Sim Sang-jung fulfilled her two-year term of office.

Candidates

Running 
 Lee Jeong-mi, member of the National Assembly.
 Park Won-seok, former member of the National Assembly.

Results 
The election was held only by the votes of the party members.

References 

Justice Party (South Korea)
Justice
Justice